

Days of the month

May 31, 2013 (Friday)

Football (soccer)
 Coupe de France Final in Saint Denis: – Evian TG

May 30, 2013 (Thursday)

Basketball
NBA Playoffs (all series best-of-7; seeds in parentheses):
Eastern Conference Finals:
Game 5 in Miami: (1) Miami Heat 90, (4) Indiana Pacers 79.  Miami leads series, 3–2.

Football (soccer)
Copa Libertadores Quarterfinals, second leg (first leg score in parentheses): Atlético Mineiro  – (2–2)  Tijuana
 Austrian Cup Final in Vienna: Pasching – Austria Wien

Tennis
French Open in Paris, France, day 5:
Men's Singles, second round:
Novak Djokovic  – [1] Guido Pella 
Richard Gasquet  – [7] Michał Przysiężny  [Q]
Grigor Dimitrov  [26] – Lucas Pouille  [WC]
Philipp Kohlschreiber  [16] – Lu Yen-hsun 
Tommy Haas  [12] – Jack Sock  [Q]
John Isner  [19] – Ryan Harrison  
Mikhail Youzhny  [29] – Federico Delbonis 
Janko Tipsarević  [8] – Fernando Verdasco 
Rafael Nadal  [3] – Martin Kližan 
Fabio Fognini  [27] – Lukáš Rosol 
Benoît Paire  [24] – Łukasz Kubot 
Kei Nishikori  [13] – Grega Žemlja 
Stanislas Wawrinka  [9] – Horacio Zeballos 
Jerzy Janowicz  [21] – Robin Haase 
Richard Gasquet  [7] – Michał Przysiężny  [Q]
Women¡s Singles, second round:
Li Na  [6] – Bethanie Mattek-Sands 
Yaroslava Shvedova  [27] – Paula Ormaechea 
Maria Kirilenko  [12] – Ashleigh Barty  [WC]
Marion Bartoli  [13] – Mariana Duque  [Q]
Kirsten Flipkens  [21] – Francesca Schiavone 
Alizé Cornet  [31] – Silvia Soler Espinosa 
Victoria Azarenka  [3] – Annika Beck 
Petra Kvitová  [7] – Peng Shuai 
Jelena Janković  [18] – Garbiñe Muguruza 
Samantha Stosur  [9] – Kristina Mladenovic 
Dominika Cibulková  [16] – Marina Erakovic 
Maria Sharapova  [2] – Eugenie Bouchard

May 29, 2013 (Wednesday)

Football (soccer)
Copa Libertadores Quarterfinals, second leg (first leg score in parentheses): 
Olimpia  2–1 (0–0)  Fluminense. Olimpia won on points 4–1.
Newell's Old Boys  0–0 (0–0)  Boca Juniors. Tied on points 2–2, Newell's Old Boys won on penalties (10–9)
 Slovenian Cup Final in Koper: Celje 0–1 Maribor
Maribor won the title for the eighth time.
International friendlies (only top 10 in FIFA World Rankings, ranking in brackets):
 [10] 2–4  [2]
 [7] 1–1

Ice hockey
Stanley Cup playoffs (all series best-of-7; seeds in parentheses):
Western Conference Semifinals:
Game 7 in Chicago: (1) Chicago Blackhawks 2, (7) Detroit Red Wings 1. Chicago won the series, 4–3

Tennis
French Open in Paris, France, day 4 (seeds in square brackets):
Men's Singles, first round: 
Benoît Paire  [24] def. Marcos Baghdatis  3–6, 7–6 (1), 6–4, 6–4
Janko Tipsarević  [8] def. Nicolas Mahut  [WC] 6–2, 7–6 (4), 6–1
Men's Singles, second round:
Jo-Wilfried Tsonga  [6] def. Jarkko Nieminen  7–6 (6), 6–4, 6–3
Milos Raonic  [14] def. Michaël Llodra  7–5, 3–6, 7–6 (3), 6–2
Roger Federer  [2] def. Somdev Devvarman  [Q] 6–2, 6–1, 6–1
Julien Benneteau  [30] def. Tobias Kamke  7–6 (9), 7–5, 5–7, 0–6, 6–4
David Ferrer  [4] def. Albert Montañés  6–2, 6–1, 6–3
Gilles Simon  [15] def. Pablo Cuevas  [PR] 6–7 (2), 6–1, 6–1, 6–1
Nicolás Almagro  [11] def. Édouard Roger-Vasselin  6–2, 6–4, 6–3
Tommy Robredo  [32] def. Igor Sijsling  6–7 (2), 4–6, 6–3, 6–1, 6–1
Andreas Seppi  [20] def. Blaž Kavčič  6–0, 7–6 (3), 6–7 (2), 4–6, 6–3
Sam Querrey  [18] def. Jan Hájek  6–4, 7–5, 6–4
Marin Čilić  [10] def. Nick Kyrgios  6–4, 6–2, 6–2
Jérémy Chardy  [25] def. Roberto Bautista-Agut  6–1, 7–5, 6–4
Kevin Anderson  [23] def. Evgeny Donskoy  6–7 (8), 6–1, 7–5, 6–2
Women's Singles, first round:
Victoria Azarenka  [3] def. Elena Vesnina  6–1, 6–4
Petra Kvitová  [7] def. Aravane Rezaï  [WC] 6–3, 4–6, 6–2
Jamie Hampton  def. Lucie Šafářová  [25] 7–6 (5), 3–6, 9–7
Kaia Kanepi  def. Klára Zakopalová  [23] 7–6 (3), 6–2 
Maria Kirilenko  [12] def. Nina Bratchikova  6–0, 6–1
Women's Singles, second round:
Serena Williams  [1] def. Caroline Garcia  [WC] 6–1, 6–2
Ana Ivanovic  [14] def. Mathilde Johansson  6–2, 6–2
Agnieszka Radwańska  [4] def. Mallory Burdette  6–3, 6–2
Sara Errani  [5] def. Yulia Putintseva  6–1, 6–1
Angelique Kerber  [8] def. Jana Čepelová  6–2, 6–2
Varvara Lepchenko  [29] def. Elina Svitolina  7–6 (5), 6–1
Roberta Vinci  [15] def. Galina Voskoboeva  [Q] 6–4, 4–6, 6–2
Carla Suárez Navarro  [20] def. Shelby Rogers  [WC] 3–6, 6–4, 6–4
Sorana Cîrstea  [26] def. Johanna Larsson  6–1, 6–4
Bojana Jovanovski  def. Caroline Wozniacki  [10] 7–6 (2), 6–3 
Petra Cetkovská  def. Anastasia Pavlyuchenkova  [19] 7–5, 2–6, 6–4 
Sabine Lisicki  [32] def. María Teresa Torró Flor  6–4, 6–0

May 28, 2013 (Tuesday)

Basketball
NBA Playoffs (all series best-of-7; seeds in parentheses):
Eastern Conference Finals:
Game 4 in Indiana: (3) Indiana Pacers 99, (1) Miami Heat 92. Series tied, 2–2

Football (soccer)
Copa Libertadores Quarterfinals, second leg (first leg score in parentheses): Santa Fe  2–0 (3–1)  Real Garcilaso. Santa Fe won on points 6–0.
 Azerbaijan Cup Final: Neftchi Baku 0–0 (5–3 on pen.) Khazar
Neftchi Baku won the title for the fifth time.

Ice hockey
Stanley Cup playoffs (all series best-of-7; seeds in parentheses):
Western Conference Semifinals
Game 7 in Los Angeles: (5) Los Angeles Kings 2, (6) San Jose Sharks 1. Los Angeles won the series, 4–3

Rugby union
IRB Junior World Rugby Trophy in Temuco, Chile, pool stage, match day 1:
Pool A:
 33–7 
 18–6 
Pool B:
 40–20 
 6–24

Tennis
French Open in Paris, France, day 3 (seeds in square brackets):
Men's Singles, first round: 
Novak Djokovic  [1] def. David Goffin  7–6 (5), 6–4, 7–5
Tommy Haas  [12] def. Guillaume Rufin  7–6 (4), 6–1, 6–3
Stanislas Wawrinka  [9] def. Thiemo de Bakker  7–5, 6–3, 6–7 (1), 7–5
Philipp Kohlschreiber  [16] def. Jiří Veselý  7–6 (3), 1–6, 7–5, 6–2
Denis Istomin  def. Florian Mayer  [28] 4–6, 6–3, 7–5, ret.
Dmitry Tursunov  def. Alexandr Dolgopolov  [22] 7–6 (7), 6–4, 7–6 (7) 
Grigor Dimitrov  [26] def. Alejandro Falla  6–4, 1–0 ret.
Mikhail Youzhny  [29] def. Pablo Andújar  4–6, 6–4, 6–2, 6–3
Women's Singles, first round:
Marion Bartoli  [13] def. Olga Govortsova  7–6 (8), 4–6, 7–5
Alizé Cornet  [31] def. Maria João Koehler  7–5, 6–2
Samantha Stosur  [9] def. Kimiko Date-Krumm  6–0, 6–2
Jelena Janković  [18] def. Daniela Hantuchová  6–4, 7–6 (7)
Yaroslava Shvedova  [27] def. Coco Vandeweghe  6–0, 3–6, 6–2
Dominika Cibulková  def. [16] Lesia Tsurenko  6–1, 6–4

May 27, 2013 (Monday)

Basketball
NBA Playoffs:
Western Conference Finals:
Game 4 in Memphis: (5) Memphis Grizzlies 86, (2) San Antonio Spurs 93. San Antonio won the series, 4–0

Ice hockey
Stanley Cup playoffs (all series best-of-7; seeds in parentheses):
Western Conference Semifinals
Game 6 in Detroit: (7) Detroit Red Wings 3, (1) Chicago Blackhawks 4. Series tied, 3–3

Tennis
French Open in Paris, France, day 2 (seeds in square brackets):
Men's Singles, first round: 
Rafael Nadal  [3] def. Daniel Brands  4–6, 7–6 (4), 6–4, 6–3
Gaël Monfils  [WC] def. Tomáš Berdych  [5] 7–6 (8), 6–4, 6–7 (3), 6–7 (4), 7–5
Jo-Wilfried Tsonga  [6] def. Aljaž Bedene  6–2, 6–3, 6–3
Richard Gasquet  [7] def. Serhiy Stakhovsky  6–1, 6–4, 6–3
Julien Benneteau  [30] def. Ričardas Berankis  7–6 (5), 6–3, 5–7, 7–6 (5)
John Isner  [19] def. Carlos Berlocq  6–3, 6–4, 6–4
Nicolás Almagro  [11] def. Andreas Haider-Maurer  [LL] 4–6, 6–4, 6–3, 6–3
Jerzy Janowicz  [21] def. Albert Ramos  7–6 (3), 7–5, 6–3
Kei Nishikori  [13] def. Jesse Levine  6–3, 6–2, 6–0
Feliciano López  def. Marcel Granollers  [31] 7–5, 2–6, 6–4, 4–6, 6–4
Marin Čilić  [10] def. Philipp Petzschner  6–1, 6–2, 6–3
Fabio Fognini  [27] def. Andreas Beck  [Q] 6–3, 7–5, 6–3
Tommy Robredo  [32] def. Jürgen Zopp  [PR] 6–3, 6–2, 6–1
Daniel Gimeno-Traver  def. Juan Mónaco  [17] 4–6, 4–6, 7–6 (4), 6–4, 6–4
Women's Singles, first round:
Li Na  [6] def. Anabel Medina Garrigues  6–3, 6–4
Agnieszka Radwańska  [4] def. Shahar Pe'er  6–1, 6–1
Caroline Wozniacki  [10] def. Laura Robson  6–3, 6–2
Maria Sharapova  [2] def. Hsieh Su-wei  6–2, 6–1
Roberta Vinci  [15] def. Stéphanie Foretz Gacon  [WC] 6–3, 6–0
Angelique Kerber  [8] def. Mona Barthel  7–6 (6), 6–2
Zuzana Kučová  [Q] def. Julia Görges  [24] 7–6 (8), 6–0
Carla Suárez Navarro  [20] def. Simona Halep  3–6, 6–2, 6–2
Varvara Lepchenko  [3] def. Mirjana Lučić-Baroni  6–1, 6–2
Svetlana Kuznetsova  def. Ekaterina Makarova  [22] 6–4, 6–2
Sloane Stephens  [17] def. Karin Knapp  6–2, 7–5
Kirsten Flipkens  [21] def. Flavia Pennetta  [PR] 2–6, 6–4, 6–0
Melanie Oudin  def. Tamira Paszek  [28] 6–4, 6–3

May 26, 2013 (Sunday)

Auto racing
Formula One:
2013 Monaco Grand Prix in Monte Carlo, Monaco: (1) Nico Rosberg  (Mercedes) (2) Sebastian Vettel  (Red Bull–Renaul) (3) Mark Webber  (Red Bull-Renault)
Sprint Cup Series
Coca-Cola 600 in Concord, North Carolina: (1) Kevin Harvick  (Richard Childress Racing, Chevrolet) (2) Kasey Kahne  (Hendrick Motorsports, Chevrolet) (3) Kurt Busch  (Furniture Row Racing, Chevrolet)
IndyCar Series:
97th Indianapolis 500 Mile Race in Speedway, Indiana: (1) Tony Kanaan  (KV Racing Technology) (2) Carlos Muñoz  (Andretti Autosport) (3) Ryan Hunter-Reay  (Andretti Autosport)
Kanaan won his first Indianapolis 500 race after his 12th attempt.

Basketball
NBA Playoffs (all series best-of-7; seeds in parentheses):
Eastern Conference Finals:
Game 3 in Indiana: (3) Indiana Pacers 96, (1) Miami Heat 114. Miami led the series, 2–1.

Cycling
Grand Tours:
Giro d'Italia, Stage 21:  Mark Cavendish  5h 30' 09"  Sacha Modolo  s.t.  Elia Viviani  s.t.
Final Classification: (1) Vincenzo Nibali   84h 53' 28" (2) Rigoberto Urán  + 4' 43" (3) Cadel Evans  + 5' 52"
Nibali won his first Giro d'Italia and his second Grand Tour.

Football (soccer)
 Copa Constitució Final: UE Santa Coloma 3–2 (a.e.t.) UE Sant Julià
UE Santa Coloma won the title for the first time.
 Belarusian Cup Final in Zhodino: FC Minsk 1–1 (4–1 in pen.) Dinamo Minsk
Minsk won the title for the first time.
 Coppa Italia Final in Rome: Lazio 1–0 Roma
Lazio won the title for the sixth time.
 Moldovan Cup Final: Veris 2–2 (2–4 in pen.) FC Tiraspol
FC Tiraspol won the title for the third time.
 Taça de Portugal Final in Oeiras: Vitória de Guimarães 2–1 Benfica
Vitória de Guimarães won the title for the first time.
 Scottish Cup Final in Glasgow: Hibernian 0–3 Celtic
Celtic won the title for the 36th time.
 Svenska Cup Final in Solna: Djurgårdens IF 1–1 (1–3 in pen.) IFK Göteborg
IFK Göteborg won the title for the sixth time.

Golf
PGA Tour: 
Crowne Plaza Invitational at Colonial in Fort Worth, Texas:
Winner: Boo Weekley  266 (−14)
Weekley won his third PGA Tour title.
European Tour:
BMW PGA Championship in Virginia Water, England:
Winner: Matteo Manassero  278 (−10)
Manassero won his fourth European Tour title.
LPGA Tour:
Pure Silk-Bahamas LPGA Classic in Bahamas:
Winner: Ilhee Lee  126 (−93)
Lee won his first LPGA Tour title.

Ice hockey
Stanley Cup playoffs (all series best-of-7; seeds in parentheses):
Western Conference Semifinals:
Game 6 in San Jose: (6) San Jose Sharks 2, (5) Los Angeles Sharks  1. Series tied, 3–3.

Tennis
French Open in Paris, France, day 1 (seeds in square brackets):
Men's Singles, first round:
Roger Federer  [2] def. Pablo Carreño  [Q] 6–2, 6–2, 6–3
Gilles Simon  [15] def. Lleyton Hewitt  3–6, 1–6, 6–4, 6–1, 7–5
David Ferrer  [4] def. Marinko Matosevic  6–4, 6–3, 6–4
Milos Raonic  [14] def. Xavier Malisse  6–2, 6–1, 4–6, 6–4
Jérémy Chardy  [25] def. Benjamin Becker  6–4, 6–2, 7–5
Kevin Anderson  [23] def. Illya Marchenko  6–3, 7–5, 6–4
Andreas Seppi  [20] def. Leonardo Mayer  6–7 (4), 6–4, 6–3, 6–7 (2), 6–4
Sam Querrey  [18] def. Lukáš Lacko  6–3, 6–4, 6–4
Women's Singles, first round:
Ana Ivanovic  [14] def. Petra Martić  6–1, 3–6, 6–3
Serena Williams  [1] def. Anna Tatishvili  6–0, 6–1
Sara Errani  [5] def. Arantxa Rus  6–1, 6–2
Urszula Radwańska  def. Venus Williams  [30] 7–6 (5), 6–7 (4), 6–4
Sabine Lisicki  [32] def. Sofia Arvidsson  6–3, 6–4
Monica Puig  def. Nadia Petrova  [11] 3–6, 7–5, 6–4
Anastasia Pavlyuchenkova  [19] def. Andrea Hlaváčková  4–6, 7–6 (5), 6–4
Sorana Cîrstea  [23] def. Kiki Bertens  5–7, 7–5, 6–2

May 25, 2013 (Saturday)

Athletics
IAAF Diamond League:
Adidas Grand Prix in New York City, United States:
Men:
100 m: Tyson Gay  10.02
800 m: David Rudisha  1:45.14
5000 m: Hagos Gebrhiwet  13:10.03 WL
110 m h: Ryan Brathwaite  13.19 SB
400 m h: Michael Tinsley  48.43 SB
Triple jump: Benjamin Compaoré  16.45
Shot put: Ryan Whiting  21.27
Women:
200 m: Veronica Campbell-Brown  22.53 SB
400 m: Amantle Montsho  49.91 MR
1500 m: Abeba Aregawi  4:03.69
3000 m st: Lydiah Chepkurui  9:30.82
Long jump: Janay DeLoach  6.79 MR
High jump: Blanka Vlašić  1.94 =MR
Pole vault: Jenn Suhr  4.63
Discus: Sandra Perković  68.48 WL, MR
Javelin: Christina Obergföll  65.33 SB

Auto racing
Nationwide Series:
History 300 in Concord, North Carolina: (1) Kyle Busch  (Toyota, Joe Gibbs Racing) (2) Kasey Kahne  (Chevrolet, JR Motorsports) (3) Joey Logano  (Ford, Penske Racing)
Drivers' championship standings (after 10 of 33 races): (1) Regan Smith  (Chevrolet, JR Motorsports) 376 points (2) Sam Hornish Jr.  (Ford, Penske Racing) 347 (3) Elliott Sadler  (Toyota, Joe Gibbs Racing) 331

Basketball
NBA Playoffs:
Western Conference Finals:
Game 3 in Memphis: (5) Memphis Grizzlies 93, (2) San Antonio Spurs 104. San Antonio led the series, 3–0

Cycling
Grand Tours:
Giro d'Italia, Stage 20:  Vincenzo Nibali   5h 27' 41"  Fabio Duarte  + 17"  Rigoberto Urán  + 19"

Football (soccer)
UEFA Champions League Final: Borussia Dortmund  1–2  Bayern Munich
Bayern Munich won the title for the fifth time.

Tennis
ATP World Tour:
Power Horse Cup in Düsseldorf, Germany:
Final: Juan Mónaco  def. Jarkko Nieminen  6–4, 6–3
Monaco won the eighth title of his career. 
Open de Nice Côte d'Azur in Nice, France:
Final: Albert Montañés  def. Gaël Monfils  6–0, 7–6(3).
Montañés won the sixth title of his career. 
WTA Tour:
Brussels Open in Brussels, Belgium:
Final: Kaia Kanepi  def. Peng Shuai  6–2, 7–5
Kanepi won the fourth title of her career. 
Internationaux de Strasbourg in Strasbourg, France:
Final: Alizé Cornet  def. Lucie Hradecká  7–6(4), 6–0
Cornet won the third title of her career.

Ice hockey
Stanley Cup playoffs (all series best-of-7; seeds in parentheses):
Eastern Conference Semifinals:
Game 5 in Boston: (4) Boston Bruins 3, (6) New York Rangers 1. Boston won series, 4–1
Western Conference Semifinals:
Game 5 in Chicago: (1) Chicago Blackhawks 4, (7) Detroit Red Wings 1. Detroit lead series, 3–2.

May 24, 2013 (Friday)

Basketball
NBA Playoffs (all series best-of-7; seeds in parentheses):
Eastern Conference Finals:
Game 2 in Miami: (1) Miami Heat 93, (4) Indiana Pacers 97. Series tied, 1–1

Cycling
Grand Tours:
Giro d'Italia, Stage 19: Stage cancelled due to weather conditions.

Ice hockey
Stanley Cup playoffs (all series best-of-7; seeds in parentheses):
Eastern Conference Semifinals:
Game 5 in Pittsburgh: (1) Pittsburgh Penguins 6, (7) Ottawa Senators 2. Pittsburgh won the series, 4–1

May 23, 2013 (Thursday)

Cycling
Grand Tours:
Giro d'Italia, Stage 18:  Vincenzo Nibali   44' 29"  Samuel Sánchez  + 58"  Damiano Caruso  + 1' 20"

Football (soccer)
UEFA Women's Champions League Final: Wolfsburg  1–0  Lyon
Wolfsburg won the title for the first time.
Copa Libertadores Quarterfinals, first leg: 
Tijuana  2–2  Atlético Mineiro
Boca Juniors  0–0  Newell's Old Boys

Ice hockey
Stanley Cup playoffs (all series best-of-7; seeds in parentheses):
Eastern Conference Semifinals:
Game 4 in New York: (6) New York Rangers 4, (4) Boston Bruins 3. Boston leads series 3–1
Western Conference Semifinals
Game 4 in Detroit: (7) Detroit Red Wings 2, (1) Chicago Blackhawks 0. Detroit leads series 3–1
Game 5 in Los Angeles: (5) Los Angeles Kings 3, (6) San Jose Sharks 2. Los Angeles led the series 3–2

May 22, 2013 (Wednesday)

Basketball
NBA Playoffs (all series best-of-7; seeds in parentheses):
Eastern Conference Finals:
Game 1 in Miami: (1) Miami Heat 103, (3) Indiana Pacers 102. Miami led the series 1–0

Cycling
Grand Tours:
Giro d'Italia, Stage 17:  Giovanni Visconti  5h 15' 34"  Ramūnas Navardauskas  + 19"  Luka Mezgec  + 19"

Football (soccer)
Copa Libertadores Quarterfinals, first leg: 
Real Garcilaso  1–3  Santa Fe
Fluminense  0–0  Olimpia
AFC Champions League Round of 16, second leg (first leg score in parentheses):
Kashiwa Reysol  3–2 (2–0)  Jeonbuk Hyundai Motors. Kashiwa Reysol won 5–2 on aggregate.
Guangzhou Evergrande  3–0 (2–1)  Central Coast Mariners. Guangzhou Evergrande won 5–1 on aggregate.
Lekhwiya  2–2 (1–0)  Al-Hilal. Lekhwiya won 3–2 on aggregate.
Esteghlal  0–0 (4–2)  Al-Shabab Al-Arabi. Esteghlal won 4–2 on aggregate.
 Croatian Cup Final, second leg (first leg score in parentheses): Lokomotiva 3–3 (1–2) Hajduk Split. Hajduk Split won 5–4 on aggregate.
Hajduk Split won the Cup for the sixth time.
 Cypriot Cup Final in Limassol: AEL Limassol 1–2 (a.e.t.) Apollon Limassol
Apollon Limassol won the Cup for the seventh time.
 Maltese FA Trophy Final in Ta' Qali: Qormi 1–3 Hibernians
The Hibernians won the Cup for the tenth time.
 Turkish Cup Final in Ankara: Fenerbahçe 1–0 Trabzonspor
Fenerbahçe won the Cup for the sixth time.
 Ukrainian Cup Final in Kharkiv: Shakhtar Donetsk 3–0 Chornomorets
Shakhtar Donetsk won the Cup for the ninth time.
 Montenegrin Cup Final in Podgorica: Budućnost 1–0 Čelik
Budućnost won the Cup for the first time.

Ice hockey
Stanley Cup playoffs (all series best-of-7; seeds in parentheses):
Eastern Conference Semifinals:
Game 4 in Ottawa: (7) Ottawa Senators 3, (1) Pittsburgh Penguins 7. Pittsburgh led the series 3–1

May 21, 2013 (Tuesday)

Basketball
NBA Playoffs:
Western Conference Finals:
Game 2 in San Antonio: (2) San Antonio Spurs 93, (5) Memphis Grizzlies 89. San Antonio led the series, 2–0.

Cycling
Grand Tours:
Giro d'Italia, Stage 16:  Beñat Intxausti  5h 52' 48"  Tanel Kangert  s.t.  Przemysław Niemiec  s.t.

Football (soccer)
AFC Champions League Round of 16, second leg (first leg score in parentheses):
FC Seoul  3–1 (0–0)  Beijing Guoan. FC Seoul won 3–1 on aggregate.
Bunyodkor  0–0 (1–2)  Buriram United. Buriram United won 2–1 on aggregate.
Al-Ahli  2–0 (1–1)  El Jaish. Al-Ahli won 3–1 on aggregate.
Al-Shabab  3–0 (2–1)  Al-Gharafa. Al-Shabab won 5–1 on aggregate.

Ice hockey
Stanley Cup playoffs (all series best-of-7; seeds in parentheses):
Eastern Conference Semifinals:
Game 3 in New York: New York Rangers 1, (4) Boston Bruins 2. Boston leads series, 3–0.
Western Conference Semifinals:
Game 4 in Los Angeles: (6) San Jose Sharks 2, (5) Los Angeles Sharks  1. Series tied, 2–2.

May 20, 2013 (Monday)

Football (soccer)
 Swiss Cup Final in Bern: FC Basel 1–1 (3–4 in pen.) Grasshopper Zürich
Grasshopper Zürich won their 18th Cup title.

Ice hockey
Stanley Cup playoffs (all series best-of-7; seeds in parentheses):
Western Conference Semifinals
Game 3 in Detroit: (7) Detroit Red Wings 3, (1) Chicago Blackhawks 1. Detroit led the series, 2–1.

May 19, 2013 (Sunday)

Auto racing
V8 Supercars:
Austin 400 in Austin, Texas, United States: (1) Jamie Whincup  (Holden, Red Bull Racing Australia) (2) Craig Lowndes  (Holden, Red Bull Racing Australia) (3) Fabian Coulthard  (Holden, Lockwood Racing)
Standings (after 5 of 14 races): (1) Whincup 1247 points (2) Lowndes 1105 8 (3) Will Davison  (Ford, Ford Performance Racing) 1029

Basketball
NBA Playoffs:
Western Conference Finals:
Game 1 in San Antonio: (2) San Antonio Spurs 105, (5) Memphis Grizzlies 83. San Antonio led the series, 1–0

Cycling
Grand Tours:
Giro d'Italia, Stage 15:  Giovanni Visconti  4h 40' 48"  Carlos Betancur  + 42"  Przemysław Niemiec  + 42"

Football (soccer)
OFC Champions League Final: Waitakere United  1–2  Auckland City
Auckland City won the title for the third time in a row and fifth overall and qualified for the 2013 FIFA Club World Cup.

Golf
PGA Tour: 
HP Byron Nelson Championship in Irving, Texas:
Winner: Bae Sang-moon  267 (−13)
Bae won his first PGA Tour title. 
European Tour:
Volvo World Match Play Championship in Kavarna, Bulgaria:
Winner: Graeme McDowell  2&1
McDowell won his eighth European Tour title.
Madeira Islands Open in Madeira, Portugal:
Winner: Peter Uihlein  273 (−15)
Uihlein won his first European Tour title.
LPGA Tour:
Mobile Bay LPGA Classic in Mobile, Alabama, United States:
Winner: Jennifer Johnson  267 (−21)
Johnson won her first LPGA Tour title.

Ice Hockey
World Championship:
Bronze medal game:  2–3 (GWS)  
Final:  1–5 
Sweden won the Championship for the ninth time. 
Stanley Cup playoffs (all series best-of-7; seeds in parentheses):
Eastern Conference Semifinals:
Game 3 in Ottawa: (7) Ottawa Senators 2, (1) Pittsburgh Penguins 1. Pittsburgh leads series, 2–1
Game 2 in Boston: (4) Boston Bruins 5, (6) New York Rangers 2. Boston leads series, 2–0.

Motorcycle racing
Moto GP:
French Grand Prix in Le Mans:
Moto GP: (1) Dani Pedrosa  (Honda) (2) Cal Crutchlow  (Yamaha) (3) Marc Márquez  (Honda)
Moto2: (1) Scott Redding  (Kalex) (2) Mika Kallio  (Kalex) (3) Xavier Siméon  (Kalex)
Moto3: (1) Maverick Viñales  (KTM) (2) Álex Rins  (KTM) (3) Luis Salom  (KTM)

Tennis
ATP World Tour:
Internazionali BNL d'Italia in Rome:
Final: Rafael Nadal  def. Roger Federer  6–1, 6–3.
Nadal won his sixth title of the year, seventh Italian Open title, 24th Masters 1000 title and 56th title overall.
WTA Tour:
Internazionali BNL d'Italia in Rome:
Final: Serena Williams  def. Victoria Azarenka  6–1, 6–3.
Williams won her fifth title of the year, second Italian Open title, 15th Premier title and her 51st title overall.

May 18, 2013 (Saturday)

Athletics
IAAF Diamond League:
Shanghai Golden Grand Prix in Shanghai, China:
Men:
200 m: Warren Weir  20.18
400 m: Kirani James  44.02 WL, =MR
1500 m: Asbel Kiprop  3:32.39
110 m h: Jason Richardson  13.23 SB
3000 m st: Conseslus Kipruto  8:01.16 WL, MR, PB
Long jump: Li Jinzhe  8.34 WL, PB
Hugh jump: Mutaz Essa Barshim  2.33 =MR, SB
Discus: Piotr Małachowski  67.34 SB
Javelin: Tero Pitkämäki  87.60 WL, MR
Women:
100 m: Shelly-Ann Fraser-Pryce  10.93 WL
800 m: Francine Niyonsaba  2:00.33 WL
5000 m: Genzebe Dibaba  14:45.92 WL
400 m h: Zuzana Hejnová  53.79 WL
Triple jump: Caterine Ibargüen  14.69 WL
Pole vault: Yelena Isinbayeva  4.70 SB
Shot put: Christina Schwanitz  20.20 PB

Auto racing
Sprint Cup Series
NASCAR Sprint All-Star Race in Concord, North Carolina:  (1) Jimmie Johnson  (Chevrolet, Hendrick Motorsports) (2) Joey Logano  (Ford, Penske Racing) (3) Kyle Busch  (Toyota, Joe Gibbs Racing)

Basketball
NBA Playoffs (all series best-of-7; seeds in parentheses):
Eastern Conference semifinals:
Game 6 in Indiana: (3) Indiana Pacers 106, New York Knicks 99. Indiana won the series, 4–2

Cycling
Grand Tours:
Giro d'Italia, Stage 14:  Mauro Santambrogio  4h 42' 55"  Vincenzo Nibali   s.t.  Carlos Betancur  +9"

Football (soccer)
 Estonian Cup Final in Tallinn: Nõmme Kalju 1–3 Flora
Flora won their sixth Cup title. 
 Latvian Cup Final in Riga: Ventspils 2–1 (a.e.t.) Liepājas Metalurgs
Ventspils won their fifth Cup title.

Horse Racing
2013 Triple Crown
2013 Preakness Stakes
Oxbow is the upset winner in the middle jewel of the annual series. Kentucky Derby winner Orb's fourth-place finish once again extends horse racing's longest losing streak by another year on the 35th Anniversary of Affirmed's victory as the last winner of sports' most elusive championship.

Ice Hockey
World Championship Semifinals:
 0–3 
 3–0 
Stanley Cup playoffs (all series best-of-7; seeds in parentheses):
Western Conference Semifinals:
Game 2 in Chicago: (1) Chicago Blackhawks 1, (7) Detroit Red Wings 4. Series tied, 1–1
Western Conference Semifinals:
Game 3 in Los Angeles: (6) San Jose Sharks 2, (5) Los Angeles Sharks 1. Los Angeles leads series, 2–1

May 17, 2013 (Friday)

Cycling
Grand Tours:
Giro d'Italia, Stage 13:  Mark Cavendish   6h 09' 55"  Giacomo Nizzolo  s.t.  Luka Mezgec  s.t.

Football (soccer)
UEFA European Under-17 Football Championship Final:  0–0 (4–5 in pen.) 
Russia won their third title. 
 Copa del Rey Final in Madrid: Real Madrid 1–2 Atlético Madrid
Atlético Madrid won their tenth Cup title. 
 Albanian Cup Final in Tirana: Laçi 1–0 Bylis Ballsh
Laçi won their first Cup title.
 Czech Cup Final in Chomutov: FK Baumit Jablonec 2–2 (5–4 in pen.) FK Mladá Boleslav
FK Baumit Jablonec won their second Cup title.

Ice hockey
Stanley Cup playoffs (all series best-of-7; seeds in parentheses):
Eastern Conference Semifinals:
Game 2 in Pittsburgh: (1) Pittsburgh Penguins 4, (7) Ottawa Senators 3. Pittsburgh leads series 2–0.

May 16, 2013 (Thursday)

Basketball
NBA Playoffs (all series best-of-7; seeds in parentheses):
Eastern Conference semifinals:
Game 5 in New York: (2) New York Knicks 85, (3) Indiana Pacers 75. Indiana leads series, 3–2
Western Conference semifinals:
Game 6 in Oakland: (6) Golden State Warriors 82, (2) San Antonio Spurs 94. San Antonio won the series, 4–2

Cycling
Grand Tours:
Giro d'Italia, Stage 12:  Mark Cavendish  3h 01' 47"  Nacer Bouhanni  s.t.  Luka Mezgec  s.t.

Football (soccer)
Copa Libertadores Round of 16, second leg (first leg score in parentheses): 
Santa Fe  1–0 (1–2)  Grêmio. Tied on points 3–3, Santa Fe won on away goals.
Olimpia  2–0 (1–2)  Tigre. Tied on points 3–3, Olimpia won on goal difference.

Ice Hockey
World Championship Quarter-finals:
 3–8 
 2–1 
 4–3 
 2–3 (GWS) 
Stanley Cup playoffs (all series best-of-7; seeds in parentheses):
Eastern Conference Semifinals:
Game 1 in Boston: (4) Boston Bruins 3, (6) New York Rangers 2. Boston leads series, 1–0.
Western Conference Semifinals:
Game 2 in Los Angeles: (5) Los Angeles Kings 4, (6) San Jose Sharks 3. Los Angeles leads series, 2–0

May 15, 2013 (Wednesday)

Basketball
NBA Playoffs (all series best-of-7; seeds in parentheses):
Eastern Conference semifinals:
Game 5 in Miami: (1) Miami Heat 94, (5) Chicago Bulls 91. Miami won the series, 4–1
Western Conference semifinals:
Game 5 in Oklahoma City: (1) Oklahoma City 84, (5) Memphis Grizzlies 88. Memphis won the series, 4–1

Cycling
Grand Tours:
Giro d'Italia, Stage 11:  Ramūnas Navardauskas  4h 23' 14"  Daniel Oss  + 1' 08"   Stefano Pirazzi   + 2' 59"

Football (soccer)
UEFA Europa League Final: Benfica  1–2  Chelsea
Chelsea won the title for the first time. 
Copa Libertadores Round of 16, second leg (first leg score in parentheses): 
Corinthians  1–1 (0–1)  Boca Juniors. Boca Juniors won on points 4–1.
Vélez Sársfield  1–2 (1–0)  Newell's Old Boys. Tied on points 3–3, Newell's Old Boys won on away goals.
AFC Champions League Round of 16, first leg: 
Central Coast Mariners  1–2  Guangzhou Evergrande
Jeonbuk Hyundai Motors  0–2  Kashiwa Reysol
Al-Shabab Al-Arabi  2–4  Esteghlal
Al-Hilal  0–1  Lekhwiya
AFC Cup Round of 16 (teams in bold advance to the quarter-finals): 
New Radiant  2–0  Selangor
East Bengal  5–1  Yangon United
Al-Qadsia  4–0  Fanja
Arbil  3–4  Al-Shorta
 Bosnia and Herzegovina Cup Final, second leg (first leg score in parentheses): Široki Brijeg – (1–1) Željezničar
 Bulgarian Cup Final in Lovech: Beroe Stara Zagora 3–3 (3–1 on pen.) Levski Sofia
Beroe Stara Zagora won their second Cup title.

Ice hockey
Stanley Cup playoffs (all series best-of-7; seeds in parentheses):
Western Conference Semifinals:
Game 1 in Chicago: (1) Chicago Blackhawks 4, (7) Detroit Red Wings 1. Chicago leads series, 1–0.

May 14, 2013 (Tuesday)

Basketball
NBA Playoffs (all series best-of-7; seeds in parentheses):
Eastern Conference semifinals:
Game 4 in Indianapolis: (3) Indiana Pacers 93, (2) New York 82. Pacers leads series, 3–1.
Western Conference semifinals:
Game 5 in San Antonio: (2) San Antonio Spurs 109, (6) Golden State Warriors 91. Spurs leads series, 3–2.

Cycling
Grand Tours:
Giro d'Italia, Stage 10:  Rigoberto Urán  4h 37' 42"  Carlos Betancur  + 20"  Vincenzo Nibali   + 31"

Football (soccer)
Copa Libertadores Round of 16, second leg (first leg score in parentheses): Palmeiras  1–2 (0–0)  Tijuana. Tijuana won on points 4–1.
AFC Champions League Round of 16, first leg: 
Buriram United  2–1  Bunyodkor
Beijing Guoan  0–0  FC Seoul
Al-Gharafa  1–2  Al-Shabab
El Jaish  1–1  Al-Ahli
AFC Cup Round of 16 (teams in bold advance to the quarter-finals): 
Semen Padang  2–1  SHB Đà Nẵng
Kelantan  0–2  Kitchee
Al-Faisaly  3–1  Al-Riffa
Al-Kuwait  1–1 (4–1 in pen.)  Duhok
UEFA European Under-17 Football Championship Semi-finals in Slovakia:
 0–2 
 0–0 (10–9 in pen.)

Ice Hockey
World Championship, Preliminary round, final matchday (teams in bold advance to the quarter-finals):
Group H in Helsinki:
 4–1 
 2–3 OT  
 2–3 OT  
Final standings:  Finland 16 points, Russia, United States 15, Slovakia 10, Germany 9, Latvia, France 7, Austria 5.
Group S in Stockholm:
 1–4 
 7–0 
 2–4  
Final standings: Switzerland 20 points, Canada 18, Sweden 15, Czech Republic 11, Norway 9, Denmark 6, Belarus 3, Slovenia 2.
Stanley Cup playoffs (all series best-of-7; seeds in parentheses):
Eastern Conference Semifinals:
Game 1 in Pittsburgh: (1) Pittsburgh Penguins 4, (7) Ottawa Senators. Penguins leads series, 1–0.
Western Conference Semifinals:
Game 1 in Los Angeles: (5) Los Angeles Sharks 2, (6) San Jose Sharks 0. Sharks leads series, 1–0.

May 13, 2013 (Monday)

Basketball
NBA Playoffs (all series best-of-7; seeds in parentheses):
Eastern Conference semifinals:
Game 4 in Chicago: (5) Chicago Bulls 65, (1) Miami Heat 88. Heat leads series, 3–1.
Western Conference semifinals:
Game 4 in Memphis: (5) Memphis Grizzlies 103, (1) Oklahoma City Thunder 97. Grizzlies leads series, 3–1.

Ice Hockey
World Championship, Preliminary round:
Group H in Helsinki:
 3–1 
 4–8 
Group S in Stockholm:
 3–2 
 4–3 OT 
Stanley Cup playoffs (all series best-of-7; seeds in parentheses):
Eastern Conference Quarterfinals:
Game 7 in Washington, D.C.: (3) Washington Capitals 0, (6) New York Rangers 5. Rangers won the series, 4–3.
Game 7 in Boston: (4) Boston Bruins 5, (5) Toronto Maple Leafs 4. Bruins won the series, 4–3.

May 12, 2013 (Sunday)

Auto racing
Formula One:
2013 Spanish Grand Prix in Montmeló, Spain: (1) Fernando Alonso  (Ferrari) 1:39:16.596 (2) Kimi Räikkönen  (Lotus–Renault) +9.338 (3) Felipe Massa  (Ferrari) +26.049

Basketball
Euroleague Final Four in London, United Kingdom:
Third-place playoff:  CSKA Moscow 74–73  FC Barcelona Regal
Final:  Olympiacos Piraeus 100–88  Real Madrid
Olympiacos Piraeus won the title for the second time in a row and the third time overall.
NBA Playoffs (all series best-of-7; seeds in parentheses):
Western Conference semifinals
Game 4 in Oakland: (6) Golden State 97, (2) San Antonio 87. Series tied, 2–2

Cycling
Grand Tours:
Giro d'Italia, Stage 9:  Maxim Belkov   Carlos Betancur  + 44"  Jarlinson Pantano  + 46"
UCI Women's Road World Cup:
Tour of Chongming Island in Shanghai, China:  Annette Edmondson   Chloe Hosking   Lucy Garner

Football (soccer)
OFC Champions League Semi-finals, second leg (first leg score in parentheses): Waitakere United  2–1 (2–0)  Amicale. Waitakere United won 4–1 on aggregate.
Waitakere reach the final for the fourth time. 
AFC President's Cup Group Stage, final matchday (teams in bold advance to the final stage):
Group B in Cebu City, Philippines:
KRL  8–0  Yeedzin
Global FC  1–6  Dordoi Bishkek
Final standings: Dordoi Bishkek, KRL 7 points, Global 3, Yeedzin 0.

Golf
PGA Tour: 
The Players Championship in Ponte Vedra Beach, Florida:
Winner: Tiger Woods  275 (−13)
Woods won his 78th title of his career.

Ice Hockey
World Championship, Preliminary round:
Group H in Helsinki:
 3–0 
 1–3  
Group S in Stockholm:
 2–1 
 1–3 
Stanley Cup playoffs (all series best-of-7; seeds in parentheses):
Eastern Conference Quarterfinals:
Game 6 in New York: (6) New York Rangers 1, (3) Washington Capitals 0. Series tied, 3–3.
Game 6 in Toronto: (5) Toronto Maple Leafs 2, (4) Boston Bruins 1. Series tied, 3–3.
Western Conference Quarterfinals:
Game 7 in Anaheim: (2) Anaheim Ducks 2, (7) Detroit Red Wings 3. Red Wings won the series, 4–3.

Tennis
ATP World Tour:
Mutua Madrid Open in Madrid, Spain:
Final: Rafael Nadal  def. Stanislas Wawrinka  6–2, 6–4.
Nadal won his third Mutua Madrid Open title, his 23rd Masters 1000 title and his 55th title overall.
WTA Tour:
Mutua Madrid Open in Madrid, Spain:
Final:  Serena Williams  def. Maria Sharapova  6–1, 6–4.
Williams won her second Mutua Madrid Open title, her third Premier Mandatory title and her 50th title overall.

May 11, 2013 (Saturday)

Auto racing
Sprint Cup Series
Bojangles' Southern 500 in Darlington, South Carolina: (1) Matt Kenseth  (Toyota, Joe Gibbs Racing)  (2) Denny Hamlin  (Toyota, Joe Gibbs Racing) (3) Jeff Gordon  (Chevrolet, Hendrick Motorsports)

Basketball
NBA Playoffs (all series best-of-7; seeds in parentheses):
Eastern Conference semifinals:
Game 3 in Indianapolis: (3) Indiana Pacers 82, (2) New York 71. Pacers leads series, 2–1
Western Conference semifinals:
Game 3 in Memphis: (5) Memphis 87, (1) Oklahoma City Thunder 81. Grizzlies leads series, 2–1

Cycling
Grand Tours:
Giro d'Italia, Stage 8:  Alex Dowsett  1h 16' 27"  Bradley Wiggins  + 10"  Tanel Kangert  + 14"

Football (soccer)
OFC Champions League Semi-finals, second leg (first leg score in parentheses): Ba  0–1 (1–6)  Auckland City. Auckland City won 7–1 on aggregate.
Auckland City reach the final for the third time in a row and the fifth time overall.
AFC President's Cup Group Stage, final matchday (teams in bold advance to the final stage):
Group A in Kathmandu, Nepal:
Erchim  1–0  Abahani Limited Dhaka
Three Star Club  2–2  Taiwan Power Company
Final standings: Three Star Club 5 points, Erchim 4, Taiwan Power Company 3, Abahani Limited Dhaka 2
UEFA European Under-17 Football Championship Group stage in Slovakia, final matchday (teams in bold advance to the semi-finals, teams in italics qualify for the 2013 FIFA U-17 World Cup):
Group A:
 0–0 
 2–1 
Final standings: Slovakia, Sweden 5 points, Austria 4, Switzerland 1.
Group B:
 1–2 
 1–1 
Final standings: Russia, Italy, Croatia 5 points, Ukraine 0.
 FA Cup Final in London: Manchester City 0–1 Wigan Athletic
Wigan Athletic won the FA Cup for the first time. 
 Greek Cup Final in Athens: Asteras Tripoli 1–3 (a.e.t.) Olympiacos
Olympiacos won the Greek Cup for the 26th time.
 La Liga, matchday 35 (teams in bold qualify for the UEFA Champions League):
Espanyol 1–1 Real Madrid
Standings: FC Barcelona 87 points (35 matches), Real Madrid 81 (36), Atlético Madrid 72 (36)
FC Barcelona won their 4th title in five years, and their 22nd overall.

Ice Hockey
World Championship, Preliminary round:
Group H in Helsinki:
 4–2 
 7–2  
 2–0  
Group S in Stockholm:
 4–1 
 2–0 
 3–1  
Stanley Cup playoffs (all series best-of-7; seeds in parentheses):
Eastern Conference Quarterfinals:
Game 6 in New York: (8) New York Islanders 3, (1) Pittsburgh Penguins 4. Penguins won the series, 4–2.

May 10, 2013 (Friday)

Athletics
IAAF Diamond League:
Qatar Athletic Super Grand Prix in Doha, Qatar:
Men:
100 m: Justin Gatlin  9.97 SB
800 m: David Rudisha  1:43.87 WL
1500 m: Asbel Kiprop  3:31.13 WL
5000 m: Hagos Gebrhiwet  7:30.36 WL, PB
400 m h: Michael Tinsley  48.92
Triple jump: Christian Taylor  17.25 m SB
High jump: Bohdan Bondarenko  2.33 m =MR, PB
Pole vault: Konstadinos Filippidis  5.82 m WL, NR, MR
Shot put: Ryan Whiting  22.28 WL, MR, PB
Javelin: Vítězslav Veselý  85.09 SB
Women:
200 m: Shelly-Ann Fraser-Pryce  22.48
400 m: Amantle Montsho  49.88 WL
1500 m: Abeba Aregawi  3:56.60 WL, NR, MR
100 m h: Dawn Harper  12.60 WL
3000 m st: Lydiah Chepkurui  9:13.75 WL, MR, PB
Long jump: Brittney Reese  7.25 WL, MR, PB
Discus: Sandra Perković  68.23 WL, MR

Auto racing
Nationwide Series:
VFW Sport Clips Help a Hero 200 in Darlington, South Carolina: (1) (2) (3)

Basketball
Euroleague Final Four in London, United Kingdom, Semi-finals:
CSKA Moscow  52–69  Olympiacos Piraeus
Olympiacos reach the final for the sixth time.
Real Madrid  74–67  FC Barcelona Regal
Real Madrid reach the final for the 15th time.
Real Madrid and Olympiacos will meet in a repeat of the 1995 final.
NBA Playoffs (all series best-of-7; seeds in parentheses):
Eastern Conference semifinals:
Game 3 in Chicago: (5) Chicago Bulls 94, Miami Heat 104. Heat leads series, 2–1
Western Conference semifinals
Game 3 in Oakland: (6) Golden State 92, San Antonio 102. Spurs leads series, 2–1

Cycling
Grand Tours:
Giro d'Italia, Stage 7:  Adam Hansen  4h 35' 49"  Enrico Battaglin  + 1' 07"  Danilo Di Luca  + 1' 07"

Football (soccer)
AFC President's Cup Group Stage:
Group B in Cebu City, Philippines, matchday 2:
Yeedzin  0–9  Dordoi Bishkek
KRL  2–0  Global FC
Group C in Phnom Penh, Cambodia, final matchday  (teams in bold advance to the final stage):
Balkan  5–0  Sri Lanka Army
Boeung Ket Rubber Field  0–1  Hilal Al-Quds
Final standings: Balkan 9 points, Hilal Al-Quds 6, Boeung Ket Rubber Field3, Sri Lanka Army 0.

Ice Hockey
World Championship, Preliminary round:
Group H in Helsinki:
 1–2 (GWS) 
 2–3  
Group S in Stockholm:
 2–4 
 1–4 
Stanley Cup playoffs (all series best-of-7; seeds in parentheses):
Eastern Conference Quarterfinals:
Game 5 in Washington, D.C.: (3) Washington Capitals 2, (6) New York Rangers 1. Capitals leads series, 3–2.
Game 5 in Boston: (4) Boston Bruins 1, (5) Toronto Maple Leafs 2. Bruins leads series, 3–2.
Western Conference Quarterfinals:
Game 6 in Detroit: (7) Detroit Red Wings 4, (2) Anaheim Ducks 3. Series tied, 3–3.
Game 6 in Los Angeles: (5) Los Angeles Kings 2, (4) Sr. Louis Blues 1. Kings won the series, 4–2.

May 9, 2013 (Thursday)

Cycling
Grand Tours:
Giro d'Italia, Stage 6:  Mark Cavendish  3h 56' 03"  Elia Viviani  s.t.  Matthew Goss  s.t.

Football (soccer)
Copa Libertadores Round of 16, second leg (first leg score in parentheses): Nacional  1–0 (0–1)  Real Garcilaso. Tied on points 3–3, Real Garcilaso won on penalties (1–4).
AFC President's Cup Group Stage, matchday 2:
Group A in Kathmandu, Nepal:
Abahani Limited Dhaka  1–1  Taiwan Power Company
Erchim  0–2  Three Star Club
 Belgian Cup Final in Brussels: Genk 2–0 Cercle Brugge
Genk won the Cup for the 4th time.
 Danish Cup Final in Copenhagen: Randers FC 0–1 Esbjerg fB
Esbjerg fB won the Cup for the 3rd time.
 KNVB Cup Final in Rotterdam: AZ 2–1 PSV Eindhoven
AZ won the Cup for the 4th time.

Ice Hockey
World Championship, Preliminary round:
Group H in Helsinki:
 1–2 
 3–5  
Group S in Stockholm:
 2–1 (GWS) 
 0–3 
Stanley Cup playoffs (all series best-of-7; seeds in parentheses):
Eastern Conference Quarterfinals:
Game 5 in Pittsburgh: (1) Pittsburgh Penguins 4, (8) New York Islanders 0. Penguins leads series, 3–2.
Game 5 in Montreal: (2) Montreal Canadiens 1, (7) Ottawa Senators 6. Senators won the series, 4–1
Western Conference Quarterfinals: 
Game 5 in Chicago: (1) Chicago Blackhawks 5, (8) Minnesota Wild 1. Blackhawks won the series, 4–1.

May 8, 2013 (Wednesday)

Basketball
NBA Playoffs (all series best-of-7; seeds in parentheses):
Eastern Conference semifinals:
Game 2 in Miami: (1) Miami Heat 115, Chicago Bulls 78. Series tied, 1–1
Western Conference semifinals:
Game 2 in San Antonio: (2) San Antonio 91, (6) Golden State Warriors 100. Series tied, 1–1

Cycling
Grand Tours:
Giro d'Italia, Stage 5:  John Degenkolb  4h 37' 48"  Ángel Vicioso  s.t.  Paul Martens  s.t.

Football (soccer)
Copa Libertadores Round of 16, second leg (first leg score in parentheses):
Atlético Mineiro  4–1 (2–1)  São Paulo. Atlético Mineiro won on points 6–0.
Fluminense  2–0 (1–2)  Emelec. Tied on points 3–3, Fluminense won on goal difference.
AFC President's Cup Group stage (teams in bold advance to the final stage):
Group B in Cebu City, Philippines, matchday 1: 
Dordoi Bishkek  1–1  KRL
Global FC  5–0  Yeedzin
Group C in Phnom Penh, Cambodia, matchday 2:
Sri Lanka Army  0–10  Hilal Al-Quds
Balkan  2–0  Boeung Ket Rubber Field
UEFA European Under-17 Football Championship Group stage in Slovakia, matchday 2:
Group A:
 1–1 
 2–2 
Group B:
 0–0 
 1–2 
 Croatian Cup Final, first leg: Hajduk Split 2–1 Lokomotiva
 Israel State Cup Final in Netanya: Ironi Kiryat Shmona 1–1 (2–4 pen.) Hapoel Ramat Gan
Hapoel Ramat Gan won the Cup for the second time.
 Polish Cup Final, second leg (first leg score in parentheses): Legia Warsaw 0–1 (2–0) Śląsk Wrocław. Legia Warsaw won 2–1 on aggregate.
Legia Warsaw won the Cup for the third time in a row and the 16th title overall.
 Serbian Cup Final in Belgrade: Jagodina 1–0 Vojvodina
Jagodina won the Cup for the first time.

Ice Hockey
World Championship, Preliminary round, 6th matchday:
Group H in Helsinki:
 0–2 
 4–1 
Group S in Stockholm:
 1–7 
 3–2 
Stanley Cup playoffs (all series best-of-7; seeds in parentheses):
Eastern Conference Quarterfinals:
Game 4 in New York: (6) New York Rangers 4, (3) Washington Capitals 3. Series tied, 2–2.
Game 4 in Toronto: (5) Toronto Maple Leafs 3, (4) Boston Bruins 4. Bruins leads series, 3–1.
Western Conference Quarterfinals:
Game 5 in Anaheim: (2) Anaheim Ducks 3, (7) Detroit Red Wings 2. Ducks leads series, 3–2.
Game 5 in St. Louis: (4) St. Louis Blues 2, (5) Los Angeles Kings 3. Kings leads series, 3–2.

May 7, 2013 (Tuesday)

Basketball
NBA Playoffs (all series best-of-7; seeds in parentheses):
Eastern Conference semifinals:
Game 2 in New York: (2) New York 105, (3) Indiana Pacers 79. Series tied, 1–1.
Western Conference semifinals:
Game 2 in Oklahoma City: (1) Oklahoma City 93, (5) Memphis Grizzlies 99. Series tied, 1–1.

Cycling
Grand Tours:
Giro d'Italia, Stage 4:  Enrico Battaglin  6h 14' 19"  Fabio Felline  s.t.  Giovanni Visconti  s.t.

Football (soccer)
AFC President's Cup Group Stage, matchday 1: 
Group A in Kathmandu, Nepal:
Taiwan Power Company  0–0  Erchim
Three Star Club  1–1  Abahani Limited Dhaka
 Armenian Cup Final in Yerevan: Pyunik 1–0 Shirak
Pyunik won the Cup for the fifth time.

Ice Hockey
World Championship, Preliminary round, 5th matchday:
Group H in Helsinki:
 6–3 
 5–3 
Group S in Stockholm:
 2–3 OT 
 7–1 
Stanley Cup playoffs (all series best-of-7; seeds in parentheses):
Eastern Conference Quarterfinals:
Game 4 in New York: (8) New York Islanders 6, (1) Pittsburgh Penguins 4. Series tied, 2–2.
Game 4 in Ottawa: (7) Ottawa Senators 3, (2) Montreal Canadiens 2. Senators leads series, 3–1.
Western Conference Quarterfinals:
Game 4 in Saint Paul: (8) Minnesota Wild 0, (1) Chicago Blackhawks 3. Blackhawks leads series, 3–1.
Game 4 in San Jose: (6) San Jose Sharks 4, (3) Vancouver Canucks 3. San Jose won the series, 4–0

May 6, 2013 (Monday)

Basketball
NBA Playoffs (all series best-of-7; seeds in parentheses):
Eastern Conference semifinals:
Game 1 in Miami: (1) Miami Heat 86, Chicago Bulls 93. Bulls leads series 1–0.
Western Conference semifinals:
Game 1 in San Antonio: (2) San Antonio 129, (6) Golden State Warriors 127. Spurs lead series 1–0.

Cycling
Grand Tours:
Giro d'Italia, Stage 3:  Luca Paolini  5h 43' 50"  Cadel Evans  + 16"  Ryder Hesjedal  + 16"

Football (soccer)
AFC President's Cup Group stage, matchday 1: 
Group C in Phnom Penh, Cambodia:
Hilal Al-Quds  2–3  Balkan
Boeung Ket Rubber Field  6–0  Sri Lanka Army
 Welsh Cup Final in Wrexham: Bangor City 1–3 (a.e.t.) Prestatyn Town
Prestatyn Town won the Cup for the first time.

Ice Hockey
World Championship, Preliminary round, 4th matchday:
Group H in Helsinki:
 2–3 
 3–1 
Group S in Stockholm:
 5–2 
 2–1 
Stanley Cup playoffs (all series best-of-7; seeds in parentheses):
Eastern Conference Quarterfinals:
Game 3 in New York: (6) New York Rangers 4, (3) Washington Capitals 3. Capitals leads series, 2–1.
Game 3 in Toronto: (5) Toronto Maple Leafs 2, (4) Boston Bruins 5. Bruins leads series, 2–1.
Western Conference Quarterfinals:
Game 4 in Detroit: (7) Detroit Red Wings 3, (2) Anaheim Ducks 2. Series tied, 2–2.
Game 4 in Los Angeles: (5) Los Angeles Kings 4, (4) Sr. Louis Blues 3. Series tied, 2–2.

May 5, 2013 (Sunday)

Auto Racing
Monster Energy NASCAR Cup Series
Aaron's 499, Talladega Superspeedway: 1. #34 David Ragan (Front Row Motorsports Ford)  2. #38 David Gilliland (Front Row Motorsports Ford)  3. #99 Carl Edwards (Roush Fenway Racing Ford)  4. #55 Michael Waltrip (Michael Waltrip Racing Toyota)  5. #48 Jimmie Johnson (Hendrick Motorsports Chevrolet)

Basketball
NBA Playoffs (all series best-of-7; seeds in parentheses):
Eastern Conference semifinals:
Game 1 in New York: (2) New York 95, (3) Indiana Pacers 102. Pacers leads series 1–0.
Western Conference semifinals:
Game 1 in Oklahoma City: (1) Oklahoma City 93, (5) Memphis Grizzlies 91. Thunder leads series 1–0.

Cycling
Grand Tours:
Giro d'Italia, Stage 2:   22' 05"   + 9"    + 14"

Football (soccer)
UEFA European Under-17 Football Championship Group stage in Slovakia, matchday 1:
Group A:
 1–0 
 0–1 
Group B:
 3–0 
 0–0 
CAF Champions League second qualifying round, second leg (first leg score in parentheses, teams in bold qualify for the Group Stage, teams in italics enter the Confederation Cup play-off round): 
Saint George  2–2 (1–1)  Zamalek.  3–3 on aggregate. Zamalek won on away goals.
Al-Ahly  2–1 (0–0)  CA Bizertin. Al-Ahly won 2–1 on aggregate. 
TP Mazembe  1–0 (1–3)  Orlando Pirates. Orlando Pirates won 3–1 on aggregate. 
CAF Confederations Cup second round, second leg (first leg score in parentheses, teams in bold qualify for the next round):
Wydad Casablanca  3–1 (0–2)  Liga Muçulmana. 3–3 on aggregate. Liga Muçulmana won on away goals.
Diables Noirs  1–1 (1–3)  CS Sfaxien. CS Sfaxien won 4–2 on aggregate. 
OFC Champions League Semi-finals, first leg: Auckland City  6–1  Ba

Golf
PGA Tour: 
Wells Fargo Championship in Charlotte, North Carolina:
Winner: Derek Ernst  280 (−8)PO
Ersnt defeats David Lynn on the first playoff hole to win his first PGA Tour title.
European Tour:
Volvo China Open in Tianjin, China:
Winner: Brett Rumford  272 (−16)
Rumford won his fifth European Tour title.
LPGA Tour:
Kingsmill Championship in Williamsburg, Virginia, United States:
Winner: Cristie Kerr  272 (−12)
Kerr won her 16th LPGA Tour title.

Ice Hockey
World Championship, Preliminary round, third matchday:
Group H in Helsinki:
 3–1 
 1–4 
 1–4 
Group S in Stockholm:
 4–3 
 3–2 GWS 
 3–2 
Stanley Cup playoffs (all series best-of-7; seeds in parentheses):
Eastern Conference Quarterfinals:
Game 3 in New York: (8) New York Islanders 4, (1) Pittsburgh Penguins 5. Penguins leads series, 2–1.
Game 3 in Ottawa: (7) Ottawa Senators 6, (2) Montreal Canadiens 1. Senators leads series, 2–1.
Western Conference Quarterfinals:
Game 3 in Saint Paul: (8) Minnesota Wild 3, (1) Chicago Blackhawks 2. Blackhawks leads series, 2–1.
Game 3 in San Jose: (6) San Jose Sharks 5, (3) Vancouver Canucks 0. San Jose leads series, 3–0

Motorcycle racing
Moto GP:
Spanish Grand Prix in Jerez de la Frontera:
Moto GP: (1) Dani Pedrosa  (Honda) (2) Marc Márquez  (Honda) (3) Jorge Lorenzo  (Yamaha)
Moto2: (1) Esteve Rabat  (Kalex) (2) Scott Redding  (Kalex) (3) Pol Espargaró  (Kalex)
Moto3: (1) Maverick Viñales  (KTM) (2) Luis Salom  (KTM) (3) Jonas Folger  (KTM)

Tennis
ATP World Tour:
BMW Open in Munich, Germany:
Final: Tommy Haas  def. Philipp Kohlschreiber  6–3, 7–6(3) 
Haas won the 14th title of his career. 
Portugal Open in Oeiras, Portugal:
Final: Stanislas Wawrinka  def. David Ferrer  6–1, 6–4
Wawrinka won the 4th title of his career. 
WTA Tour:
Portugal Open in Oeiras, Portugal:
Final: Anastasia Pavlyuchenkova  def. Carla Suárez Navarro  7–5, 6–2
Pavlyuchenkova won her second title of the year and the fifth of her career.

May 4, 2013 (Saturday)

Auto racing
Nationwide Series:
Aaron's 312 in Talladega, Alabama: (1) Regan Smith (Chevrolet, JR Motorsports) (2) Joey Logano (Ford, Penske Racing) (3) Kasey Kahne (Chevrolet, JR Motorsports)

Basketball
NBA Playoffs (all series best-of-7; seeds in parentheses):
Eastern Conference first round: 
Game 7 in Brooklyn: (4) Brooklyn Nets 93, (5) Chicago Bulls 99. Bulls won the series, 4–3

Cycling
Grand Tours:
Giro d'Italia, Stage 1:  Mark Cavendish  2h 58' 38"  Elia Viviani  s.t.  Nacer Bouhanni  s.t.

Football (soccer)
CAF Champions League second qualifying round, second leg (first leg score in parentheses, teams in bold qualify for the Group Stage, teams in italics enter the Confederation Cup play-off round): 
Recreativo do Libolo  3–1 (0–0)  Enugu Rangers. Recreativo de Libolo won 3–1 on aggregate. 
Espérance ST  1–0 (0–0)  JSM Béjaïa. Espérance ST won 1–0 on aggregate. 
Séwé Sport  0–0 (1–1)  FUS Rabat. 1–1 on aggregate. Séwé Sport won on away goals.
Stade Malien  0–0 (0–3)  Coton Sport. Coton Sport won 3–0 on aggregate 
CAF Confederations Cup second round, second leg (first leg score in parentheses, teams in bold qualify for the next round):
SuperSport United  1–3 (0–0)  ENPPI. ENPPI won 3–1 on aggregate.
LLB Académic  1–0 (0–1)  ASEC Mimosas. 1–1 on aggregate. LLB Académic won on penalties.
US Bitam  3–0 (0–0)  USM Alger. US Bitam won 3–0 on aggregate.
Étoile du Sahel  6–1 (1–1)  Recreativo da Caála. Étoile du Sahel won 7–2 on aggregate. 
FAR Rabat  2–1 (0–0)  Azam. FAR Rabat won 2–1 on aggregate. 
OFC Champions League Semi-finals, first leg: Amicale  0–2  Waitakere United
 Irish Cup Final in Belfast: Cliftonville 1–3 (a.e.t.) Glentoran
Glentoran won the Cup for the 21st time.

Ice Hockey
World Championship, Preliminary round, second matchday:
Group H in Helsinki:
 5–3 
 6–0 
 2–0 
Group S in Stockholm:
 3–1 
 3–1 
 1–2 
Stanley Cup playoffs (all series best-of-7; seeds in parentheses):
Eastern Conference Quarterfinals:
Game 2 in Washington, D.C.: (3) Washington Capitals 1, (6) New York Rangers 0. Series tied 1–1.
Game 2 in Boston: (4) Boston Bruins 2, (5) Toronto Maple Leafs 4. Series tied 1–1.
Western Conference Quarterfinals:
Game 3 in Detroit: (7) Detroit Red Wings 0, (2) Anaheim Ducks 4. Ducks leads series, 2–1.
Game 3 in Los Angeles: (5) Los Angeles Kings 1, (4) Sr. Louis Blues 0. St. Louis leads series, 2–1.

May 3, 2013 (Friday)

Basketball
NBA Playoffs (all series best-of-7; seeds in parentheses):
Eastern Conference first round: 
Game 6 in Boston: (7) Boston Celtics 80, (2) New York Knicks 88. Knicks won the series, 4–2
Game 6 in Atlanta: (3) Indiana Pacers 81, (6) Atlanta Hawks 73. Pacers won the series, 4–2
Western Conference first round:
Game 6 in Houston: (8) Houston Rockets 94, (1) Oklahoma City Thunder 103. Thunder won the series, 4–2
Game 6 in Memphis: (5) Memphis Grizzlies 118, (4) Los Angeles Clippers 105. Grizzlies won the series, 4–2

Football (soccer)
CAF Champions League second round, second leg (first leg score in parentheses): ES Sétif  3–1 (1–3)  AC Léopards. 4–4 on aggregate. AC Léopards won on penalties.
AC Léopards advance to the group stage. ES Sétif entered the Confederation Cup play-off round.
CAF Confederations Cup second round, second leg (first leg score in parentheses): Ismaily  0–0 (0–0)  Al-Ahly Shendi. 0–0 on aggregate. Ismaily won on penalties.

Ice Hockey
World Championship, Preliminary round, first matchday:
Group H in Helsinki:
 2–6 
 4–3 OT  
Group S in Stockholm:
 2–0 
 2–3 
Stanley Cup playoffs (all series best-of-7; seeds in parentheses):
Eastern Conference Quarterfinals:
Game 2 in Pittsburgh: (1) Pittsburgh Penguins 3, (8) New York Islanders 4. Series tied, 1–1.
Game 2 in Montreal: (2) Montreal Canadiens 3, (7) Ottawa Senators 1. Series tied, 1–1.
Western Conference Quarterfinals: 
Game 2 in Chicago: (1) Chicago Blackhawks 5, (8) Minnesota Wild 2. Blackhawks leads series, 2–0.
Game 2 in Vancouver: (3) Vancouver Canucks 2, (6) San Jose Sharks 3. San Jose leads series, 2–0.

May 2, 2013 (Thursday)

Basketball
NBA Playoffs (all series best-of-7; seeds in parentheses):
Eastern Conference first round: 
Game 6 in Chicago: (5) Chicago Bulls 92, (4) Brooklyn Nets 95. Series tied 3–3
Western Conference first round:
Game 6 in Oakland: (6) Golden State Warriors 92, (3) Denver Nuggets 88. Golden State won the series, 4–2

Football (soccer)
UEFA Europa League Semi-finals, second leg (first leg score in parentheses):
Benfica  3–1 (0–1)  Fenerbahçe. Benfica won 3–2 on aggregate.
Chelsea  3–1 (2–1)  Basel. Chelsea won 5–2 on aggregate.
Copa Libertadores Round of 16, first leg: 
São Paulo  1–2  Atlético Mineiro
Emelec  2–1  Fluminense
 Polish Cup Final, first leg: Śląsk Wrocław 0–2 Legia Warsaw

Ice hockey
Stanley Cup playoffs (all series best-of-7; seeds in parentheses):
Eastern Conference Quarterfinals:
Game 1 in Montreal: (2) Montreal Canadiens 2, (7) Ottawa Senators 4. Senators leads series, 1–0.
Game 1 in Washington, D.C.: (3) Washington Capitals 3, (6) New York Rangers 1. Capitals leads series, 1–0.
Western Conference Quarterfinals:
Game 2 in Anaheim: (2) Anaheim Ducks 3, (7) Detroit Red Wings 1. Series tied, 1–1.
Game 2 in St. Louis: (4) St. Louis Blues 2, (5) Los Angeles Kings 1. S. Louis leads series, 2–0.

May 1, 2013 (Wednesday)

Basketball
NBA Playoffs (all series best-of-7; seeds in parentheses):
Eastern Conference first round: 
Game 5 in New York: (2) New York Knicks 86, Boston Celtics 92. Knicks leads series 3–2.
Game 5 in Indianapolis: (3) Indiana Pacers 106, Atlanta Hawks 83. Pacers leads series 3–2.
Western Conference first round:
Game 5 in Oklahoma City: (1) Oklahoma City Thunder 100, Houston Rockets 107. Thunder leads series 3–2.

Football (soccer)
UEFA Champions League Semi-finals, second leg (first leg score in parentheses):
FC Barcelona  0–3 (0–4)  Bayern Munich. Bayern Munich won 7–0 on aggregate.
Bayern Munich reach the final for the second time in a row, the third in four years, and tenth time overall
Copa Libertadores Round of 16, first leg: 
Grêmio  2–1  Santa Fe
Boca Juniors  1–0  Corinthians 
2013 AFC Champions League group stage, final matchday  (teams in bold advance to the knockout stage):
Group A:
Al Shabab  2–1  Al Jazira
Tractor Sazi  2–4  El Jaish
Final standings: Al Shabab 13 points, El Jaish 11, Al-Jazira 5, Tractor Sazi 4.
Group B:
Lekhwiya  2–0  Al-Ettifaq
Pakhtakor  1–2  Al Shabab Al Arabi
Final standings: Lekhwiya 11 points, Al-Shabab Al-Arabi 9, Al-Ettifaq, Pakhtakor 7.
Group E:
FC Seoul  2–2  Buriram United
Vegalta Sendai  1–2  Jiangsu Sainty
Final standings: FC Seoul 11 points, Buriram United, Jiangsu Sainty 7, Vegalta Sendai 6.
Group F:
Guangzhou Evergrande  0–0  Jeonbuk Hyundai Motors
Muangthong United  0–1  Urawa Red Diamonds
Final standings: Guangzhou Evergrande 11 points, Jeonbuk Hyundai Motors, Urawa Red Diamonds 10, Muangthong United 1.
2013 AFC Cup group stage, final matchday  (teams in bold advance to the knockout stage):
Group A:
Safa  1–0  Al-Kuwait
Al-Riffa  1–1  Regar-TadAZ
Final standings: Al-Kuwait 12 points, Al-Riffa, Saga 10, Regar-TadAZ 2
Group B:
Erbil  2–0  Al-Ansar
Fanja  3–1  Al-Ahli Taizz
Final standings: Erbil 18 points, Fanja 10, Al-Ansar 7, Al-Ahli Taizz 0.
Group E:
Semen Padang  3–1  Churchill Brothers
Kitchee  5–0  Warriors
Final standings: Semen Padang 16 points, Kitchee 12, Churchill Brothers 4, Warriors 3.
Group F:
Yangon United  2–0  Sunray Cave JC Sun Hei
New Radiant  6–1  Persibo Bojonegoro
Final standings: New Radiant, Yangon United 15 points, Sunray Cave JC Sun Hei 4, Persibo Bojonegoro 1.
CONCACAF Champions League Finals, second leg (first leg score in parentheses): 
Monterrey  4–2 (0–0)  Santos Laguna
Monterrey won the CONCACAF Champions League for the third time in a row and qualify for the 2013 FIFA Club World Cup
 Liechtenstein Cup Final in Vaduz: Balzers 1–1 (0–3 pen.) Vaduz
Vaduz won the Cup for the 40th time.
 Slovak Cup Final in Ružomberok: Žilina 0–2 Slovan Bratislava
Slovan Bratislava won the Cup for the 13th time.

Ice hockey
Stanley Cup playoffs (all series best-of-7; seeds in parentheses):
Eastern Conference Quarterfinals:
Game 1 in Pittsburgh: (1) Pittsburgh Penguins 5, (8) New York Islanders 0. Penguins leads series, 1–0.
Game 1 in Boston: (4) Boston Bruins 4, (5) Toronto Maple Leafs 1. Bruins leads series, 1–0.
Western Conference Quarterfinals:
Game 1 in Vancouver: (3) Vancouver Canucks 1, (6) San Jose Sharks 3. San Jose leads series, 1–0.

References

05